Susan Tom (born 1948) is a woman from Fairfield, California, who became famous when HBO aired a documentary, My Flesh and Blood, about her in 2003. Tom is the biological mother of two children, and the adoptive mother of eleven children with special needs.

Tom was previously married and adopted her first two children while still with her husband. Following the birth of her two now fully grown boys, Jeremy and Ben, Tom decided that she wanted a girl and adopted her daughter Emily from South Korea. Following Emily's adoption, the social worker from her case again contacted Susan and enquired whether she would be able to take in a newborn, Margaret, suffering from failure to thrive and numerous other health conditions. According to Tom, it is at this point that she and her husband, Philip, began to drift apart. Eventually, the strain was too much and the couple separated. Over the next decade, Tom adopted 9 other children with special needs, who likely would not have found stable homes otherwise. In her own words, Tom explained the drastic expansion as follows, "Well from three to four isn't that much of a jump and at that point what's five? After five, the noise isn't going to get any louder and you're already cooking big meals so, well- it's not that hard to get to twelve."

In 2003 Tom was nominated for the "Most Inspirational Person of the Year Award", sponsored by beliefnet.com. Tom lost that award to Archbishop Joseph O'Malley, but she was later awarded with assemblywoman Louis Wolk's "Woman of the Year" award, which was presented on March 24, 2003 in Sacramento
Susan Tom and two of her friends established the "Susan Tom Family Foundation", which aims to educate the public about various diseases and medical conditions that affect children and which accepts donations for her family's education.

In the summer of 2005, the show Extreme Makeover: Home Edition built Tom and her family a new house. The Toms went to Walt Disney World while the EM team built the house. The show mentioned Anthony's death (a few clips of him from My Flesh and Blood were shown during the episode).

Children

Here is a partial list of Tom's children and their characteristics:

Anthony: (b.1982-d.2004) Anthony had a rare skin disease that usually does not allow people to reach adulthood and he died from cancer in December 2004.
Faith: Faith suffered burns as an infant. She has excelled as a student and overcome the constant taunts of fellow students. Faith is also an avid reader.
Hannah: An avid swimmer, Hannah was born without legs. She maintains a great relationship with her adoptive sister, Xenia, in particular. As stated on Extreme Makeover, she loves to draw.
Joe (b.1987–d.2002): Joe had psychological problems, as well as cystic fibrosis. Arguably the most outspoken of Tom's children during the documentary, he died of cystic fibrosis complications while the documentary was being filmed.
Margaret: Margaret was adopted by Tom, following brain surgery as an infant, and she has no current major health problems. She has become Tom's top assistant and a loving sister to her adoptive siblings. Margaret is in school to become a nurse.
Xenia: Also born without legs, Xenia is an avid figure skater, using her arms to practice her favorite sport. Xenia is described by her family as flirtatious and has had some significant boy friendships during her life. As seen on Extreme Makeover: Home Edition, Xenia stated she wanted to travel the world, specifically Africa (she was born in Russia). She also has an interest in photography and has a great sense of humor. When getting into the new car EM gave Margaret, Xenia got in and joked, "Look at all the legroom!!"
Olivia "Libby": Libby was born with spina bifida, uses a wheelchair, and loves board games.
Cloe: Cloe was born with the inability to bend her elbows and knees. She has an interest in fashion.
Katie: Katie was born with Fetal Alcohol Syndrome and is mentally challenged. Katie loves the Backstreet Boys.
Susie: (b.1978-d.1999) Had the same rare skin disease as Anthony (Epidermolysis bullosa). She died at age 21, prior to the filming of My Flesh and Blood
Emily: adopted from Korea by Tom during her marriage and has arthritis but living independently.

References

External links
beliefnet.com's page on the Toms
See their Extreme Home Makeover!

1950 births
Living people
People from Fairfield, California
Adoption in the United States
Adoption workers